'''Giorgi Magrakvelidze''' (born 21 January 1998) is a Georgian water polo player for WPC DINAMO TBILISI and the Georgian national team.

He participated at the 2018 Men's European Water Polo Championship.

References

1998 births
Living people
Male water polo players from Georgia (country)
Expatriate water polo players
Expatriate sportspeople from Georgia (country) in Slovakia